South Carolina Highway 26 may refer to:

South Carolina Highway 26 (1920s), a former state highway from Georgetown to north of Indian Land
South Carolina Highway 26 (1950s), a former state highway from Camden to Kershaw

026